Keshava Sudhakar is an Indian politician serving as the Minister of Medical Education and Health of Karnataka from 6 February 2020. He was elected to the Karnataka Legislative Assembly from Chikkaballapur in the 2018 Karnataka Legislative Assembly election as a member of the Indian National Congress and later was re-elected to the house in 2019 as a member of the Bharatiya Janata Party.

He was the youngest cabinet minister in the Fourth B. S. Yeddyurappa ministry being only 46 years old at the time of taking charge, serving as the Minister of Medical education from Health and Family Welfare Department. He was again sworn-in as a minister in the Basavaraj Bommai ministry.

During the COVID-19 pandemic in Karnataka he was part of the COVID-19 Response team for Karnataka along with Chief Minister B. S. Yeddyurappa and Minister of Health  and Family Welfare B. Sriramulu and few others. He was key participant of key policy making and rapid response to the pandemic.

Controversies

Operation Kamala

He was one of the 15 MLAs who fell in Operation Kamala and resigned in July 2019, effectively bringing down the H. D. Kumaraswamy-led coalition government of Indian National Congress and Janata Dal (Secular).

References

1979 births
Living people
Karnataka MLAs 2013–2018
Bharatiya Janata Party politicians from Karnataka
Indian National Congress politicians from Karnataka
People from Chikkaballapur
Karnataka MLAs 2018–2023